Oak Point University, formerly Resurrection University is a private university in Chicago, Illinois. It was founded on February 17, 1914, and has two colleges, a College of Nursing and a College of Health Sciences, and offers undergraduate and graduate/professional programs in the health sciences with a significant focus on nursing. The university has over 5,600 university alumni. There are two campus locations, one in Wicker Park and one in Oak Brook.

History 
1914: Oak Point University, originally named West Suburban Hospital School for Nurses was founded with the West Suburban Hospital that began serving the Oak Park community on February 11, 1914.  The school officially began on February 17, offering a diploma program.

1925: A new building was completed for the school on the 7th floor of the medical center, providing students with classrooms, laboratories, dormitories, swimming pool, and a ballroom.

1946: The West Suburban Hospital for Nurses entered into an affiliation with Wheaton College that lasted until 1982

1953: The name of the school was changed to West Suburban Hospital School of Nursing

1981: The University was recognized by the Illinois Board of Higher Education, giving degree granting and operating authority to offer a nursing degree.

1982: The Baccalaureate Nursing Program established, including a generic and Registered Nurse completion option.

1985: The University entered into an affiliation with Concordia College (now Concordia University Chicago). Again, the name was changed to: Concordia-West Suburban College of Nursing.

2003: The affiliation with Concordia College ended and the name was revised to West Suburban College of Nursing.

2004: Resurrection Health Care purchased West Suburban Medical Center and the College of Nursing. West Suburban College of Nursing became a part of Resurrection Health Care.

2008: Higher Learning Commission approved the baccalaureate degrees of health informatics and health administration.

2008: The Master of Science in Nursing program became accredited at the university and the first class to graduate with the MSN degree occurred in 2009.

2010: West Suburban College of Nursing became Resurrection University with a College of Nursing and a College of Health Sciences.

2011: Resurrection Health Care and Provena Health joined together to form Presence Health.

2012: Resurrection University and Concordia University Chicago reestablish the nursing degree program partnership.

2012: The University moved to the campus of Saint Elizabeth Medical Center in the Wicker Park neighborhood of Chicago.

2014: The College of Nursing celebrated its 100-year anniversary.

2015: The Saint Francis School of Radiography (SFSOR), was merged with the University, which now offered a Bachelor of Science in Imaging Technology (B.S.I.T.) in the College of Health Sciences. The degree is accredited by the Joint Review Committee on Education in Radiologic Technology (JRCERT).

2016: Dr. Therese Scanlan assumed the role of President for Resurrection University.

2017: The University's Doctor of Nursing Practice program began in the fall semester.

2018: In March, the affiliation between Resurrection University and Presence Health ended, and Presence Legacy Association became a member of Resurrection University.

2021: Resurrection University became an independent university and changed its name to Oak Point University.

2021: Oak Point University added a second campus in Oak Brook, Illinois.

2021: The University added two new Master of Science in Nursing nurse practitioner/post-graduate certificate programs: Adult-Gerontology Acute Care (AGACNP) and Psychiatric-Mental Health (PMHNP).

Academics 
Resurrection University has two colleges: the College of Nursing and the College of Allied Health. It is institutionally accredited by the Higher Learning Commission (HLC). Many programs are accredited by specific accreditation agencies, including:

 Commission on Accreditation for Health Informatics & Information Management (CAHIIM) 
 Commission on Collegiate Nursing Education (CCNE) 
 Joint Review Committee on Education of Radiologic Technologists (JRCERT)

References

External links
 Official website

Universities and colleges in Chicago